The 1st Reserve Officers' Training Corps Brigade is an Army Reserve Officers' Training Corps brigade based at the Fort Knox, Kentucky. This brigade is responsible for the 10 Senior Military Colleges and Military Junior Colleges.

Battalions
Senior Military Colleges
University of North Georgia
Norwich University
Texas A&M University
Texas A&M University Corps of Cadets
The Citadel
Virginia Military Institute
Virginia Tech
Virginia Tech Corps of Cadets

Military Junior Colleges
Georgia Military College
Marion Military Institute
New Mexico Military Institute
Valley Forge Military Academy and College

Reserve Officers' Training Corps
Fort Knox